Claudio Grassi and Riccardo Ghedin were the defending champions, having won the title in 2013, but they lost in the first round to Laurynas Grigelis and Adrian Ungur, who eventually won the tournament, defeating Flavio Cipolla and Alessandro Motti in the final, 3–6, 6–2, [10–5].

Seeds

Draw

References
 Main Draw

Morocco Tennis Tour - Casablanca - Doubles
2015 Morocco Tennis Tour
Morocco Tennis Tour – Casablanca